Huaihua is a prefecture-level city in the southwest of Hunan province, China. It has a population of 4,741,948 (2010 census), accounting for 7.22% of the provincial population. According to the 2010 Census, 2,909,574 people, or 61.4% of the population, are Han Chinese. Minorities constitute 38.6% of the population, with 1,832,289 people. The Dong, Miao, Tujia, Yao and Bai are major native minority groups. Huaihua is the central region of the Dong ethnic population, home to nearly 28.35% of the Chinese Dong ethnic group.

Huaihua is very mountainous, being located between the Wuyi and Xuefeng mountain ranges. The Yuan river runs from the south to the north. The forest coverage reached 70.8% in 2015.

Administration
 Hecheng District
 Hongjiang city
 Hongjiang District
 Yuanling County
 Chenxi County
 Xupu County
 Zhongfang County
 Huitong County
 Mayang Miao Autonomous County
 Xinhuang Dong Autonomous County
 Zhijiang Dong Autonomous County
 Jingzhou Miao and Dong Autonomous County
 Tongdao Dong Autonomous County

Geography and economy
Huaihua lies in the mountainous west of Hunan, south-east of Zhangjiajie National Forest Park, and shares the same mountain belt. Railroads is a major means of transportation in the region, and an airport was opened in 2004.

Huaihua is home to the Second Artillery Corps Base 55, which is charged with maintaining ICBMs.  The nuclear assets at Huaihua are intended for small-scale nuclear conflicts  (with a limited, but nuclear, exchange), as well as the ability to strike Guam, one of only two B-2 bases.

Climate

Government

The current CPC Party Secretary of Huaihua is Peng Guofu and the current Mayor is Lei Shaoye.

Transportation 

Huaihua is located at a major railway node and its economy has historically benefited from the concentration of railways meeting in the city. Five major railways, the Shanghai–Kunming railway, the Shanghai–Kunming high-speed railway, the Jiaozuo–Liuzhou railway, the Chongqing–Huaihua railway, and the Zhangjiajie–Huaihua high-speed railway intersect in the city. Through these railways Huaihua has connections to almost all major Chinese cities. Passenger trains are served by the Huaihua railway station. Huaihua South railway station meanwhile is served by high-speed trains.

A rail freight handling station, Huaihua West, was opened on 31 January 2021.

Huaihua is on the route of G65 Baotou-Maoming Expressway, which connects it with Chongqing to the northwest. It is also on the route of G60 Shanghai–Kunming Expressway, which connects it with Guiyang to the west, and Changsha to the east. Other roads that run through the city include China National Highway 209 and China National Highway 320.

By air, Huaihua is served by Huaihua Zhijiang Airport, located some 31 kilometers from the city proper in the Zhijiang Dong Autonomous County.

External links

Official website of Huaihua Government

References

 
Prefecture-level divisions of Hunan
Cities in Hunan